Albertine Lapensée (August 10, 1898 – unknown) was a Canadian ice hockey player, often thought to be Canada's first female hockey "superstar". She played for the Cornwall Victorias (previously known as the Cornwall Nationals) between 1915 and 1918, when women's hockey enjoyed some prominence, as most of the healthy men were taking part in the First World War.

Lapensée was reputed to have scored over 150 goals and led her team to be unbeaten throughout 1916 and 1917, when records indicate that they won 45 of their 46 games. However, after demanding a share of the profits from the games, Lapensée disappeared from the sport in 1918, still aged under 20. There were a number of rumours: that she had died in the 1918 flu pandemic, that she had travelled to New York to undergo a sex-change, or that she had always been a draft dodging man, though none provided any credible evidence. A 1940 profile of her father refuted all those claims, detailing her as living as a woman in New York.

Early life and hockey career

Albertine Lapensée was born on August 10, 1898, in Cornwall, Ontario, the youngest of eleven children born to Phillippe and Matilde. She grew up playing ice hockey outdoors on frozen ponds and rivers alongside her brothers and other boys. With the outbreak of the First World War, the exodus of men to the fighting resulted in the decline of amateur hockey leagues. This meant that hockey arenas were losing revenue, and to counter this, the owners of the Jubilee Arena in Montreal organised a four-team women's hockey league in 1915, the Eastern Ladies' Hockey League. Lapensée joined the Cornwall Nationals, quickly renamed the Cornwall Victorias, who joined the league a year later. On her debut in January 1916, she scored five goals in a 6–0 win for the Victorias, while a week later she scored six as her team won 8–0. In another game, she scored 15 goals, to help Cornwall to a 21–0 victory. Her exploits helped to promote the ladies' sport; the Jubilee Arena was selling out its 3,000 seats for games, while the Cornwall Victorias were being asked to sign contracts with other teams to play in their arenas – as long as Lapensée was playing. In the press, she was nicknamed the "Miracle Maid" by the English-language press, and "l'etoile des etoiles" ("the star of stars") by the French-language press.

Such was her domination of the sport that there were persistent rumours that she was actually a man. These first surfaced immediately after her first match, when the members of the opposition Ottawa side accused her of being a man. The accusation was not unfounded in the league, where it was not uncommon for boys to be disguised as women to improve the spectacle. Some opposition teams went as far as removing Lapensée's tuque during games to check how long her hair was. Her father made a public statement that the claims were false, and in February 1916, the Montreal Star investigated the claims. The reporter spoke to "dozens and dozens of people from Cornwall who had known her since she was little", and concluded that "from what he learned he is thoroughly convinced 'he' is a 'she'." Despite this the rumours lingered, and some modern sources still speculate that she might have been a man. In 2011, an article in the Cornwall Standard Freeholder claimed that "we'll never know if Albertine was actually an Albert", suggesting the possibility that Lapensée was actually a draft dodger named Albert.

Newspaper records suggest that between 1916 and 1917, the Cornwall Victorias went unbeaten for 46 games; winning 45 and tying 1. During that period, they outscored their opponents 228–29, of which Lapensée scored 150, averaging more than three goals per game. Lapensée's ability and strength led to some odd occurrences in games she was involved in. In one, the Montreal Westerns played a 17-year-old, Ada Lalonde, who was being touted as "a hockey prodigy" and a talent to rival Lapensée. Lalonde turned out to be a young man that Montreal's owner had convinced to take part to try and outshine Lapensée. In another game, the Westerners goaltender, a Miss Hardman, was so scared of Lapensée's powerful shot that she wore a baseball catcher's mask. Lapensée realised how much money the league was making for the arenas, and how significant her role was in her team's success, and she demanded a share of the profits. These claims, leaked to the press, led the Montreal Star to dub her a prima donna. The team owners refused, and Lapensée retired from the league in 1918.

Later life
After quitting the ELHL, which itself faded into obscurity and folded after the war, Lapensée disappeared from the limelight. A variety of rumours circulated; there were some reports that she had died during the 1918 flu pandemic. Although myth that she had undergone sex change surgery made it into a 1983 official history of Cornwall, the Library and Archives Canada's feature on women's hockey debunks it. The story follows that after her operation, she returned to the Cornwall area as a man, "Albert Smythe", ran a garage and got married. However, her mother's obituary in 1929 lists her as a living daughter, as does a 1940 profile of her father, which details she married a man named Albert Schmidt from New York. Further refuting the theory was the fact that sex reassignment operations did not take place until after the Second World War.

References

Bibliography
 
 

1898 births
Canadian women's ice hockey forwards
Ice hockey people from Ontario
Sportspeople from Cornwall, Ontario
Year of death missing